Gary Wheaton is a Canadian-born American businessman and politician. He served in the New Hampshire House of Representatives from December 1, 2010, to April 6, 2011

Background
Wheaton grew up in Manchester, New Hampshire.  He worked many years in the high-tech business arena. He also served in the United States military.

Political career
Wheaton is a former Republican member of the New Hampshire House of Representatives from Seabrook, New Hampshire.

References

Living people
Republican Party members of the New Hampshire House of Representatives
People from Manchester, New Hampshire
21st-century American politicians
Year of birth missing (living people)